Zat or similar can mean:
Zat, Iran, a village in Iran
Zat, a rank in the Mansabdar system of the Mughal Empire
zat, ISO 639-3 language code for Tabaá Zapotec, a Zapotec language
ZAT is the IATA code for Zhaotong Airport in China
ZAT, abbreviation of Zariba of All Territory, a fictional organization in Ultraman Taro